Steve Hely is an American writer, current co-executive producer on the series Veep.

Hely has written for the television shows Late Show with David Letterman (receiving an Emmy nomination for Outstanding Writing for a Variety or Comedy Show), Last Call with Carson Daly, where he also served as an associate producer, American Dad!, 30 Rock, and The Office.

Hely has also authored or co-authored two books. The Ridiculous Race, written with Vali Chandrasekaran and published in 2008 by Macmillan, chronicled a real-life race around the world between Hely and Chandrasekaran. Each set off from Los Angeles in opposite directions, with only one rule: "No airplanes." In 2009, Grove/Atlantic published Hely's debut novel, How I Became a Famous Novelist. Hely subsequently won the 2010 Thurber Prize for American Humor for the novel.

Hely is the co-host of The Great Debates, a weekly podcast in which he debates the great issues of the day with David King.  Hely often takes the pro, or more life-affirming stance.

Hely attended the Roxbury Latin School and Harvard University, where he received a Bachelor of Arts degree. While at Harvard, Hely served two terms as president of the Harvard Lampoon.

Television appearances 
Hely has appeared onscreen in both 30 Rock and The Office. He appeared as a poster-collecting bachelor named Jerem in the 30 Rock episode "Lee Marvin vs. Derek Jeter". Additionally, he appeared as a flautist and shirtless bohemian in The Office episode "Gettysburg".

References

External links
 
 
 Author Blog "End of Books"
 April Fool's Joke on Galleycat
 "The World’s Foremost Consultant on the Future of Publishing" article on The Rumpus

The Harvard Lampoon alumni
Living people
Year of birth missing (living people)
American television writers
American male television writers
Roxbury Latin School alumni
Late Show with David Letterman